Seo Taiji and Boys III is the third studio album by Korean musical group Seo Taiji and Boys. With over 1.6 million copies sold, it is one of the best-selling albums in South Korea.

Overview
This third album switched gears to being much more heavy metal and rock driven. It was partially recorded in Los Angeles using American session musicians. The danceable tunes are nearly non-existent except "Balhaereul Ggumggumyeo" (발해를 꿈꾸며, "Dreaming of Balhae"), an alternative rock song which indicates a hope of reuniting North and South Korea. Instead, songs such as the controversial "Gyoshil Idea" (교실 이데아, "Classroom Idea") with death growl vocals by Ahn Heung-chan of thrash metal band Crash take center stage.

The version of the album included in Seo Taiji's 15th anniversary box set adds a remix of "Gyoshil Idea" and six live tracks, including a cover of "Farewell to Love" originally by Seo's previous band Sinawe.

Controversies

The songs "Classroom Idea", "Dr. Jekyll and Mr. Hyde" and "It's My Business" highly criticized the older generation of Koreans and their education system.

"Classroom Idea" was extremely critical of the education system and the pressure placed on the country's youth to succeed academically. The fact that Seo is a high school dropout himself added to the discussion, with the group labelled as a negative influence to young people. The song was banned from TV and radio, even though the government run Public Performance Ethics Committee gave the song a pass.

Shortly after the album's release, the group were accused of backmasking Satanic messages in their songs, specifically in "Classroom Idea". Although the mainstream news media later proved these accusations to be based on extremely tenuous evidence, the moral panic proved difficult to eliminate entirely.

Reception
Seo Taiji and Boys won a Golden Disc Award for "Balhaereul Ggumggumyeo" in 1994.

In April 1996, Billboard reported that the album had sold over 1.6 million copies.

Kyunghyang Shinmun ranked the album number 57 on its 2007 list of the Top 100 Pop Albums.

Track listing 
English titles are based on the official translations provided by the Seotaiji Company for international markets.

Personnel
Seo Taiji − vocals, keyboards on tracks 2−5, 8 & 9, guitar on tracks 4 & 6, bass on tracks 4 & 6, computer programming on tracks 3 & 9, drum machine on track 5
Yang Hyun-suk − vocals
Lee Juno − vocals
Tim Pierce − guitar on tracks 2, 5 & 8, acoustic guitar on tracks 2 & 8
John Pierce − bass on tracks 2, 8 & 9
Josh Freese − drums on tracks 4, 6 & 9
Denny Fongheiser − drums on tracks 2 & 8
Ahn Heung-chan − vocals on tracks 4 & 5
Gwon Seonmi − cello on tracks 2 & 8
Japan King − Orchestra strings on track 7
Choe Taewan − acoustic piano on track 3
DJ Qbert − scratching on tracks 4 & 5
Kim Seog-jung − remix of track 16

References

External links

1994 albums
Seo Taiji and Boys albums